Ley Line Entertainment is an American film production company founded in 2018 by Theresa Steele Page and Tim Headington. The company is best known for producing films Light from Light (2019) Miss Juneteenth (2020), The Green Knight (2021) and Everything Everywhere All At Once (2022).

History
In December 2018, Theresa Steele Page and Tim Headington launched Ley Line Entertainment, a film and television production and finance company, additionally producing theater and music. 

The company's first film Light from Light directed by Paul Harrill had its world premiere at the 2019 Sundance Film Festival in January 2019, and was released in November 2019, by Grasshopper Film. The company also produced Everything Everywhere All At Once alongside A24, which won the Academy Award for Best Picture and grossed over $100 million.

Filmography

2010s

2020s

Upcoming

References

External links
 

American companies established in 2018
Film production companies of the United States
Entertainment companies established in 2018
American independent film studios